The Klein Matterhorn (sometimes translated as Little Matterhorn) is a peak of the Pennine Alps, overlooking Zermatt in the Swiss canton of Valais. The Klein Matterhorn is part of the Breithorn massif and overlooks on its south side the almost equally high flat glacier named Breithorn Plateau, just north of the international border with Italy.
 
The Klein Matterhorn, with the adjacent ski-lifts to the slightly higher Gobba di Rollin, is also a year-round ski area, marketed as "Matterhorn Glacier Paradise", and part of the international ski area between Zermatt and Breuil-Cervinia.

Fast ascents to a height above  will frequently lead to headaches or other symptoms of altitude sickness with sensitive people.

Construction of the Klein Matterhorn cable car lift

Even before the construction license application was filed, the building promoter had to negotiate with the Swiss Alpine Club and with the Swiss Nature Conservation Society.  These discussions resulted in two large natural reserve zones (the "Matterhorn" region and the "Monte Rosa" region).  The third area (the "Schwarzsee-Theodul Glacier-Klein Matterhorn" region) was designated as a tourist zone.

Licensing was further delayed until 1969 by the citizens of Zermatt filing a complaint to the governing council of the Canton of Valais.  In December 1970, the Swiss government finally gave permission for the cable way, but progress was further delayed until 1973 by objections from environmentalists.  Eventually, on 17 December 1973, the Federal Council rejected objections and granted a construction license.

The next major obstacle proved to be the recruitment of a work force to build the lift system.

The construction of this cable car started in August 1976 at all three construction sites: the valley terminal, the three tower sites and the mountain terminal. Creation of the mountain terminal was a difficult undertaking. Some  of concrete were used in the mountain station, all of which had to be transported there by helicopter in specially insulated tanks, mixed with warm water and 2% anti-freeze.

In December 1978, all four track cables were installed, and all remaining operations were completed by the spring of 1979.  In the fall of 1979, the two 100 passenger cabins were flown from the village of Täsch to the valley terminal, attached to the hanger frames with the carriages lifted onto the track cables, with operations starting on 23 December, the start of the winter season. The Cable car was built by Von Roll LTD Bern Switzerland.

Current operation

The Klein Matterhorn is at the end of a multi-stage cable car journey from Zermatt, via Furi and Trockener Steg. A tunnel connects it with the Breithorn Plateau on the south side. There is also a panoramic view platform on the top which can be reached by elevator—located midway through the tunnel—followed by a  climb up stairs. The Ice Cave ("Glacier Grotto") is just outside the southern entrance with a view into the glacier below. As of 2005, over 14 million passengers had visited since completion, an average of 560,000 per year. The carriages were refurbished in 2005.

The station is a high-alpine environment, and in the thin air one must use caution when making any physical effort. If possible, take time to acclimatise on the way to the Klein Matterhorn. There are plenty of warnings about this on the way up.

The lift serves the largest and highest summer-ski area in Europe. During summer months one can find many professional, as well as beginner, skiers here. Access to the ski slopes is via a tunnel blasted straight through the mountain.

The Klein Matterhorn is a starting point to several  summits that can be reached within a few hours. These include the Breithorn and its subsidiary peaks, Pollux and Castor.

Plans
On December 9, 2005, the ZBAG (Zermatt Bergbahnen AG, the owner of this station) announced plans to significantly expand the facilities at the Klein Matterhorn. They had ordered studies from five large Swiss architectural firms stating some of the following demands: new heating-, water-, waste- and electricity-installations, new toilets, shop and cafeteria, restaurant, mountain cabin (40 beds, SAC (Schweizer Alpen-Club) style), underground access to the gletscher palast (ice cave) and spare room for 2 cableways: one from Trockener Steg (3-cable gondola) and one from Testa Grigia (double cable car). Additionally: a private investor (Heinz Julen) launched the idea of a hotel. Official press announcement (in German) 

It was announced in July 2006 the winning design for this construction was to consist of a pyramid of glass, with an observation platform at 4,000 meters with sky lifts on the outer wall to whisk passengers to the "new summit".  Zermatt Mountain Cableways seem intent on marketing the construction as "the newest 4,000+ meter peak in the Alps".

See also
List of mountains of Switzerland accessible by public transport

References

External links

Klein Matterhorn Zermatt Tourism
Klein Matterhorn Zermatt Bergbahnen

Mountains of Valais
Mountains of the Alps
Alpine three-thousanders
Tourist attractions in Switzerland
Cable cars in Switzerland
Mountains of Switzerland
Three-thousanders of Switzerland